Howard Clark Hollister (September 11, 1856 – September 24, 1919) was a United States district judge of the United States District Court for the Southern District of Ohio.

Education and career

Born in Cincinnati, Ohio, Hollister received an Artium Baccalaureus degree from Yale University in 1878 and a Bachelor of Laws from the Cincinnati Law School (now the University of Cincinnati College of Law) in 1880. He was in private practice in Cincinnati from 1880 to 1893, and was an assistant prosecuting attorney of Hamilton County, Ohio from 1881 to 1882. He was a Judge of the Court of Common Pleas for the 1st Judicial District of Ohio from 1893 to 1903.

Federal judicial service

He was confirmed by the United States Senate on March 7, 1910, and received his commission the same day. Hollister served in that capacity until his death on September 24, 1919.

Personal

Hollister was married to Alice Keys of Cincinnati on June 2, 1887. They had four children. Hollister was a Republican in national politics, but opposed to the local Republican political machine.

References

Sources
 

1856 births
1919 deaths
Ohio Republicans
Ohio state court judges
Judges of the United States District Court for the Southern District of Ohio
United States district court judges appointed by William Howard Taft
20th-century American judges
Yale University alumni
University of Cincinnati College of Law alumni
Lawyers from Cincinnati
Psi Upsilon